Greg Kelley is a Canadian politician, who was elected to the National Assembly of Quebec in the 2018 provincial election. He represents the electoral district of Jacques-Cartier as a member of the Quebec Liberal Party.

He is the son of Geoffrey Kelley, his predecessor as MNA for the district.

Personal life
In June 2021, Kelley announced his upcoming wedding to fellow Assembly member Marwah Rizqy; this is the first marriage between two sitting members of the Assembly. Their first child, Gabriel, was born on October 6, 2022.

References

Living people
Quebec Liberal Party MNAs
21st-century Canadian politicians
Politicians from Montreal
Year of birth missing (living people)
Anglophone Quebec people
Quebec people of Irish descent